People's Peace may refer to:

 People's Peace Army, a fictional army in The Sword of Truth series
 People's Peace Treaty, a collaborative effort of Vietnamese and American students to end the Vietnam War

See also

 People of peace